The 2001 Commonwealth of Independent States Cup was the ninth edition of the competition between the champions of former republics of Soviet Union. It was won by Spartak Moscow for the sixth time overall and third in a row. For the third and final time the competition was played in a two-division format (first introduced in 1999). The next year the format was changed, mostly due to relegation of Ukraine from the top division.

Participants

 1 Zhashtyk-Ak-Altyn Kara-Suu replaced SKA-PVO Bishkek (2000 Kyrgyzstan champions), who withdrew having most of their players busy in a national team training camp.

First Division

Group C

 Georgia promoted to the Top Division

Results

Group D
Unofficial table

Official table

 Armenia promoted to the Top Division

Results

Top Division

Group A

Tajikistan relegated to First Division

Results

Group B

Ukraine relegated to First Division

Results

Final rounds

Semifinal
 Two results carried over from the First Round: Spartak v Slavia 3–1 and Köpetdag v Skonto 0–0

Results

Final

Top scorers

External links
2001 CIS Cup at rsssf.com
2001 CIS Cup at football.by
2001 CIS Cup at kick-off.by

2001
Commonwealth of Independent States Cup 
Commonwealth of Independent States Cup 
Commonwealth of Independent States Cup 
Commonwealth of Independent States Cup
Commonwealth of Independent States Cup